La Val is a comune (municipality) in the province of South Tyrol in northern Italy, located about  northeast of the city of Bolzano.

Geography

History

Coat-of-arms
The emblem consists of a vert branch, placed on bend, with two leaves on argent, it is the emblem of the family Rü. The emblem was adopted in 1969.

Society

Linguistic distribution
According to the 2011 census, 97.66% of the population speak Ladin, 1.53% Italian and 0.81% German as first language.

Demographic evolution

Economy

Tourism
In tourist centers people also speak some English. The religion is Roman Catholic.

Tourism (hiking, mountain climbing, mountain biking) is a mainstay of the local economy as is agriculture. There is no locally-centered ski tourism, but in winter shuttle buses transport tourists to the nearby ski resorts such as Alta Badia.  Tourism usually peaks in the winter months due to the comunes' location and attractions.

Whereas in earlier decades the agricultural economy was, to a large degree, self-sufficient, it has become, meanwhile, more of a monoculture based on cattle.

Down the valley at the Gran Ega river in Pederoa is a handicraft and industrial zone (shoes, textiles).

La Val (Wengen) borders the following municipalities: Badia, Mareo and San Martin de Tor.

References

External links

(Ladin)  Homepage of the municipality

Municipalities of South Tyrol